Walter Michael Ezell (born April 6, 1959) is an American law enforcement officer and politician serving as the U.S. representative for  since 2023.

Early life and education 
Ezell was born in Pascagoula, Mississippi. His father, S.H. "Buck" Ezell, was a police officer.

He attended the University of Southern Mississippi, where he earned a Bachelor of Science degree in criminal justice. He also graduated from the Mississippi Law Enforcement Officers Training Academy in 1981 and FBI National Academy in 1990.

Career

Law enforcement officer 
Ezell served in the Pascagoula Police Department, first as a patrolman in 1980, then as captain of the detective division in 1992, and then as chief of police for Ocean Springs, Mississippi, from 1998 to 2000.

Following a stint as police chief in Ocean Springs, Ezell returned to Pascagoula, where he received an assignment to the FBI Safe Streets Task Force. He later served as chief of law enforcement for the Pascagoula School District and the Singing River Health System.

Ezell was elected sheriff of Jackson County, Mississippi, in a 2014 special election after Mike Byrd resigned.

U.S. House of Representatives

Elections

2022 

In 2021, Ezell announced that he would challenge Republican incumbent Steven Palazzo in Mississippi's 4th congressional district in the 2022 elections. In the seven-way June 7 primary election, Palazzo received the most votes, 31.5%, and Ezell finished second with 25%. Because no candidate received 50% of the vote, Palazzo and Ezell faced each other in a runoff election. All the other candidates in the race endorsed Ezell after they were eliminated.

Ezell won the June 28 primary runoff election and defeated Democratic nominee Johnny DuPree in the November general election.

Personal life 
Ezell is married to Suzette Ezell. They have one daughter and one granddaughter.

References

External links
 Congressman Mike Ezell official U.S. House website
Mike Ezell for Congress campaign website

|-

1959 births
21st-century American politicians
Living people
Mississippi Republicans
Mississippi sheriffs
People from Pascagoula, Mississippi
University of Southern Mississippi alumni
Republican Party members of the United States House of Representatives from Mississippi